The Royal Commission on Newspapers, popularly known as the Kent Commission, was a Canadian Royal Commission chaired by Tom Kent. It was created in 1980 in response to growing concerns over concentration of media ownership in Canada. The Commission's final report was delivered in 1981.

Much of the impetus for the creation of the commission was the virtually simultaneous closure, on August 26–27, 1980, of two major daily newspapers: the Ottawa Journal (owned by the Thomson Corporation) and the Winnipeg Tribune (owned by Southam Inc.). These closures gave each chain a monopoly in the two markets, Southam with the Ottawa Citizen and Thomson with the Winnipeg Free Press. The resulting allegations of collusion prompted the Canadian government to launch the Kent Commission.

References

Bibliography

External links
Tom Kent stumps Front Page Challenge panel

Royal commissions in Canada
Mass media regulation in Canada